Deal was an archaic UK and US unit of volume used to measure wood.   In the late 18th and early 19th centuries, a deal originally referred to a wooden board between 12 and 14 feet long that was traded as a maritime commodity.

Definition 
Deal (UK) is equal to 7 ft × 6 ft × 5/2 in.

Deal (US) is equal to 12 ft × 11 in × 3/2 in.

Whole deal is equal to 12 ft × 11 in × 5/8 in.

Split deal is equal to 12 ft × 8 ft × 16 in.

Conversion 
1 Deal (UK) ≡ 8.75 cubic foot ≡ 105 board foot ≡ 0.24777240768 m3

1 Deal (US) ≡ 1.375 cubic foot ≡ 16.5 board foot ≡ 0.0389356640640 m3

1 Whole deal ≡ 55/96 cubic foot ≡ 55/8 (≡ 6.875) board foot ≡ 0.01622319336 m3

1 Split deal ≡ 128 cubic foot ≡ 1536 board foot ≡ 3.624556363776 m3

See also
 List of obsolete units of measurement

References

Units of volume
Customary units of measurement